The 2018 NRL season was the 112th  season of professional rugby league in Australia and the 21st season run by the National Rugby League.

Regular season
All times are in AEST (UTC+10:00) on the relevant dates.

Round 1

Round 2

Round 3

Round 4

Round 5

Round 6

Round 7

Round 8

Round 9

Round 10

Round 11

The match between Melbourne Storm and Manly-Warringah Sea Eagles featured 4 sin bins and a send off. (Jake Trbojevic, Dylan Walker, Apisai Koroisau, Josh Addo-Carr) (Curtis Scott).

Round 12

Round 13

Round 14

Round 15

Round 16

Round 17

Canberra trailed 14-28 with 5:34 left on the clock and then scored three tries to win 32-28.

Round 18

Round 19

Round 20

Round 21

Round 22 (Women In League Round)

Round 23

Round 24

Round 25

Penrith defeated Melbourne in Melbourne for the first time since round 15, 2005.

References

Results